Lee Kang-min (born December 28, 1990) is a South Korean actor. He is perhaps best known for his roles in the television series Temperature of Love (2017) and My Strange Hero (2018–2019). He is sometimes known under the name Lee Sung-woo.

Filmography

Television

References

External links
 

1990 births
Living people
South Korean male television actors
21st-century South Korean male actors